Trichloro(dichlorophenyl)silane is a compound with formula Si(C6H3Cl2)Cl3.

See also
 Organosilicon#Silyl halides

Chlorosilanes
Chlorobenzenes